APL Materials is a peer-reviewed open access scientific journal published by the American Institute of Physics. The editor-in-chief is Judith L. MacManus-Driscoll (University of Cambridge). It covers bioinspired materials, magnetic materials, photovoltaics, tissue engineering, and various other topics. According to the Journal Citation Reports, the journal has a 2021 impact factor of 6.635.

Abstracting and indexing
The journal is abstracted and indexed in the Science Citation Index Expanded, Current Contents/Physical Chemical and Earth Sciences, and Current Contents/Engineering Computing and Technology.

References

External links

Materials science journals
Publications established in 2013
English-language journals
American Institute of Physics academic journals
Open access journals